V. Subbaiah Naicker was an Indian politician and former Member of the Legislative Assembly of Tamil Nadu. He was elected to the Tamil Nadu legislative assembly as an Independent candidate from Kovilpattio constituency in 1957 election.

References 

Tamil Nadu politicians
Madras MLAs 1957–1962